Walter Church may refer to:

Walter G. Church Sr., member of the North Carolina General Assembly
Walter Church (American football), American football quarterback 
Walter Church (Australian politician) (1829–1901), New South Wales politician